James Pierce Jr. House, also known as Piercestead, is a historic home located in Wabash Township, Tippecanoe County, Indiana.  It was built in 1833–1834, and is a two-story, Greek Revival style brick dwelling, with a one-story rear ell and one-story wing. It is four bays wide and has a slate gable roof.  It also housed the Cass Post Office between 1846 and 1855.

It was listed on the National Register of Historic Places in 1982.

References

Houses on the National Register of Historic Places in Indiana
Greek Revival houses in Indiana
Houses completed in 1834
Houses in Tippecanoe County, Indiana
National Register of Historic Places in Tippecanoe County, Indiana